Heyday Films Ltd. is a British film studio founded in 1996 by producer David Heyman in London, England, and currently headquartered in Borehamwood, Hertfordshire. The studio made its feature film debut with the production of Ravenous in 1999, and is best known for producing the Harry Potter film series, based on the popular fantasy novels of the same name by author J. K. Rowling.

Productions

Film

Television
Heyday have produced a number of television series.

References

1996 establishments in England
British companies established in 1996
Companies based in Hertsmere
Film production companies of the United Kingdom

Mass media companies established in 1996